Juri Litvinov (also romanized as Yuriy Litvinov, born May 6, 1978) is a Kazakhstani former competitive figure skater. He is a multiple national champion of Kazakhstan and competed at the 1998 Winter Olympics, World Championships, and Four Continents Championships. He moved to the United States with his then-coach Sergei (Sergey) Korovin in 1996. Litvinov retired from competition in 2003.  As of late 2019, he is a certified professional ice skating coach, holding certifications with the United States Figure Skating Association, Professional Skaters Association, and USA Hockey.  He coaches figure skating and hockey at MedStar Capitals Iceplex in Arlington, Virginia and Mt. Vernon Recreation Center in Alexandria, Virginia.

Programs

Results

References 

Sources
 
 Skatabase: 1990s Worlds
 Skatabase: 1990s Olympics

Kazakhstani male single skaters
1978 births
Living people
Olympic figure skaters of Kazakhstan
Figure skaters at the 1998 Winter Olympics
Sportspeople from Karaganda
Figure skaters at the 1999 Asian Winter Games
Competitors at the 2001 Winter Universiade